Dead Men Don't Count (also known as Cry for Revenge) is a 1968 Spanish-Italian Spaghetti Western film written and directed by Rafael Romero Marchent.

Cast

References

External links

1968 films
Spaghetti Western films
Spanish Western (genre) films
1968 Western (genre) films
Films scored by Riz Ortolani
Films directed by Rafael Romero Marchent
Films shot in Almería
Films with screenplays by Rafael Romero Marchent
1960s Italian films